Alfred Zefi (born 20 August 1991) is an Albanian professional footballer who plays as a defensive midfielder for Albanian club KF Tomori.

Club career

Korabi Peshkopi
On 1 July 2016, Zefi joined newly promoted Albanian Superliga side Korabi Peshkopi by penning a one-year contract for an undisclosed fee. He signed along with 12 other players, five of them being his teammates at Laçi. He was given squad number 22, and made his competitive debut on 7 September in the opening 2016–17 Albanian Superliga week against Laçi, appearing in the last 13 minutes of an eventual goalless draw. On 12 February of the following year, during the matchday 21 against Luftëtari Gjirokastër, Zefi was sent-off in the 61st minute for headbutting a player of Luftëtari, as the match finished with a 2–0 defeat for Zefi's side. This led the Disciplinary Committee to ban him for the following five league matches.

Kamza
In July 2017, Zefi signed with fellow promoted top flight side Kamza. He played his first match for his new side on 9 September in the opening week of 2017–18 Albanian Superliga against Kukësi, playing 64 minutes in a 1–0 loss. In his first season at Kamza, Zefi made 17 league appearances as Kamza retained their top flight spot by winning in the final matchday against Partizani Tirana. He left the club in July 2018.

Bylis Ballsh
In August 2018, Zefi left Albanian Superliga after eight seasons and joined Albanian First Division side Bylis Ballsh.

Career statistics

Honours
Laçi
 Albanian Cup: 2012–13, 2014–15

References

External links
FSHF profile

1991 births
Living people
People from Lezhë
Albanian footballers
Association football midfielders
KF Laçi players
KF Korabi Peshkopi players
FC Kamza players
KF Bylis Ballsh players
Besa Kavajë players
KS Burreli players
KF Tomori players
Kategoria e Parë players
Kategoria Superiore players